= Tatapani coalfield =

Coal field in Jharkhand, India

- Location: Chhattisgarh, India
- Products: Coal

The Tatapani is a large coal field located in the east of India in Jharkhand. Tatapani represents one of the largest coal reserve in India having estimated reserves of 2.65 billion tonnes of coal.
